Joseph Henry Mensah (31 October 1928 – 12 July 2018) was a Ghanaian politician and economist.

Education
In his early education, J. H. Mensah attended Achimota School. He proceeded to the University of the Gold Coast (now the University of Ghana) between 1948 and 1954. He then headed to the University of London and Stanford University, where he earned both a bachelor's and master's degree respectively with a specialization in economic theory and development. In 1954, Mensah became a Research Fellow in Economics at the University of Ghana, a position he held until 1958.

Political career
Mensah began working as an assistant inspector of taxes in 1953 while the Gold Coast was still under colonial rule. In 1958, Mensah joined the United Nations Secretariat at the Centre for Development Planning, Projections and Policies, in New York City, United States. Mensah returned to Ghana in 1961 as the Head of Agency at the National Planning Commission. The National Planning commission drew and implemented the country's Seven-Year Development Plan (1963/64–1969–70). In 1969, he was elected to parliament and became the Finance minister in the Busia government until 1972, when he was replaced by future head of state Ignatius Kutu Acheampong after the military coup d'état.

Elections
Mensah represented the Sunyani East constituency in the 2nd, 3rd and 4th parliaments of the republic of Ghana.

2000 Elections 
In the year 2000, Mensah won the Ghanaian general elections as the member of parliament in the 3rd parliament of the 4th republic of Ghana for the  Sunyani East constituency of the Brong Ahafo Region of Ghana. He won on the ticket of the New Patriotic Party. His constituency was a part of the 14 parliamentary seats out of 21 seats won by the New Patriotic Party in that election for the Brong Ahafo Region. The New Patriotic Party won a majority total of 100 parliamentary seats out of 200 seats in the 3rd parliament of the 4th republic of Ghana. He was elected with 27,756 votes out of 43,128 total valid votes cast. This was equivalent to 65.1% of the total valid votes cast. He was elected over Capt.(rtd) F. Adu Kwaku Nkrumah of the  National Democratic Congress, Shiekh Mustapha Abdulah of the Convention People's Party, Moses Owusu -Yeboah of the People's National Convention, Boachie Amankwa of the United Ghana Movement and Boniface Kojo Mensah of the National Reform Party.  These won 11,550, 1,269, 1,039, 592 and 427 votes respectively out of the total valid votes cast. These were equivalent to 27.1%, 3.0%, 2.4%, 1.4% and 1.0% respectively of total valid votes cast.

2004 Elections 
He was elected as the Member of Parliament for the Sunyani East constituency for the 4th parliament in the 2004 Ghanaian general elections. He was elected with 32,035 votes out of 53,972 total valid votes cast. This was equivalent to 59.40% of total valid votes cast. He was elected over Justice Samuel Adjei of the National Democratic Congress, Cubagee Raphael – an independent candidate, Rev. Nana Adjei-Ntow – also an independent candidate, Theophilus Kwame Chartey of the Convention People's Party, Awuah Philip of the Every Ghanaian Living Everywhere Party and A. A. Boasiako of the Democratic People's Party. These obtained 17,860 votes, 1,478 votes, 998 votes, 674 votes, 581votes and 346 votes respectively  out of the total valid votes cast. These were equivalent to 33.10%, 2.70%, 1.80%, 1.20%, 1.10% and 0.60% of all total valid votes cast. Mensah was elected on the ticket of the New Patriotic Party. His constituency was a part of 14 out of 24 constituencies won by the New Patriotic Party in the Brong Ahafo region in that election. In all, the New Patriotic Party won a majority total of 128 parliamentary representation out of a total 230 parliamentary seats in the 4th Parliament of the 4th republic of Ghana.

Post Coup
Beginning in 1974, Mensah worked in the private sector both in Ghana and abroad. He was imprisoned by the National Redemption Council from 1975 to 1978. Although banned from political activity in 1979, he was active for the Popular Front Party in the 1979 elections. He also served as Chairman of the Sunyani District Council in Brong-Ahafo Region (1979–1981), and proprietor of Banka Farms. Exiled in England, in 1983 he headed a group opposing the PNDC. He also served on the African Advisory Council of the African Development Bank from 1993 to 1997. In December 1996, Mensah contested a parliamentary seat in the Sunyani East constituency as a member of the New Patriotic Party, which he won. He was re-elected in 2000. Prior to John Kufuor's election in 2001, Mensah was the Minority Leader in Parliament from 1997 to 2001. In addition, he served as Minister and Leader of Government Business from 2001 to 2003; Minister for Public Sector Reform and National Institutional Renewal Programme from 2003 to 2005 as well as Senior Minister from 2005 to 2006 all during the Kufuor-led administration.

Personal life and family
He was the older brother of the former First Lady, Theresa Kufuor.

Death and state funeral
J. H. Mensah died on Thursday 12 July 2018 at the 37 Military Hospital in Accra after a protracted illness, having suffered a stroke a year earlier. He was accorded a state funeral by the Government of Ghana on Friday 17 August 2018 at the Accra International Conference Centre and  buried at the new Military Cemetery at Burma Camp.

References

External links
Joseph Henry Mensah at African People Database

1928 births
2018 deaths
Alumni of Achimota School
Ghanaian MPs 1969–1972
Ghanaian MPs 1997–2001
Ghanaian MPs 2001–2005
Ghanaian MPs 2005–2009
Finance ministers of Ghana
Ghanaian economists
Academic staff of the University of Ghana
University of Ghana alumni
Alumni of the University of London
Stanford University alumni
Popular Front Party politicians
New Patriotic Party politicians
20th-century Ghanaian politicians
21st-century Ghanaian politicians
People from Brong-Ahafo Region
Progress Party (Ghana) politicians